Yauheni Akhramenka (born 30 June 1995) is a Belarusian professional racing cyclist, who currently rides for UCI Continental team . He rode at the 2015 UCI Track Cycling World Championships.

Major results
Source:

2012
 2nd Team pursuit, National Track Championships
2013
 2nd Under-23 points race, Mexico Copa Internacional de Pista
2014
 1st  Madison, National Track Championships
2015
 1st Individual pursuit, Panevezys
2016
 1st Team pursuit, Grand Prix Minsk
2017
 National Track Championships
1st  Team pursuit
2nd Madison
2nd Points race
 2nd Time trial, National Under-23 Road Championships

References

External links
 

1995 births
Living people
Belarusian male cyclists
People from Zhlobin District
European Games competitors for Belarus
Cyclists at the 2019 European Games
Sportspeople from Gomel Region